The K110D is Pentax's entry-level DSLR. It has 6.1 Megapixels (6.1 Million effective pixels). The K110D is youngest of three sibling cameras in terms of specifications.  It differs from the K100D only in lacking an in-body image stabilization system.

The K110D has a 2.5 in LCD display screen with 210,000 pixels of resolution. It uses Secure Digital cards to record both JPEG and RAW image formats. The K110D uses AA alkaline batteries to power it, though an AC adapter is also compatible. It has a 23.5 mm x 15.7 mm CCD sensor to record its images. The body itself comprises a stainless steel chassis with a fiber reinforced plastic shell for durability. Continuous shooting mode allows for up to 2.8 frames per second to be recorded, which is five JPEGs (on highest quality setting) or three RAW format images. The Camera is compatible with PictBridge printers. The DSLR is considered "entry-class" among DSLRs.

With firmware update, using SDHC cards is possible. Latest firmware version is 1.02.

Marketing and Sibling Details
Said to be shipped in August, 2006, the body would be sold in addition to a smc 18-55mm lens for about $599.99. The K110D would have virtually the same specifications as its superior, the K100D. The most noticeable difference was the Shake-Reduction system found in the K100D and K10D models. Pentax claimed that the Shake-Reduction system would offer a two-stop advantage, and produce almost blur-free images.

Ned Bunnell, the Pentax Imaging Company's director of marketing, was quoted saying:

“The ease-of-use, advanced features and attractive price make the Pentax K100D digital SLR a perfect choice for users moving up from a point-and-shoot camera", meaning that the new Pentax DSLRs were easy to use, even for a beginner. The K110D and K100D, unlike the K10D, do not have the typical aperture adjustment wheel found under the shutter release button on most DSLRs.

The K100D, K100D Super and K110D have been discontinued in favor of the K200D and K-m.

Notes and references

 Pentax Imaging "K110D"
 Digital Photography Review "Pentax K100D and K110D"
 PopPhoto "New Pentax K100D DSLR Features Shake Reduction System"

External links

 https://web.archive.org/web/20070224232149/http://www.pentaximaging.com/
 http://www.dpreview.com/

K110D
Pentax K-mount cameras